Paul Cummins (born 1984 in County Kildare, Ireland) is an Irish basketball player who plays for the Ireland national basketball team.

Biography
Cummins was born in County Kildare, Ireland in 1984. After he was named 'junior Irish player of the year' in 2001, he went to play basketball and study at the Ravenscroft School in North Carolina. Cummins then attended top ranked national powerhouse South Kent School on an athletic scholarship for one year (2003) and graduated as one of 6 basketball players to earn a further NCAA Division I scholarship from South Kent.

Career
Cummins is an Irish senior men's international basketball player and has represented Ireland since he was 15 years old. While attending high-school in America, Cummins was named to the North Carolina All-State basketball and track teams. He led the Ravenscroft Ravens to state finals in both basketball and soccer, and was the NC state long-jump champion in 2003. At the South Kent School, Cummins joined a nationally ranked basketball team that had six players sign with NCAA Division-1 basketball programs, and one player, Dorell Wright, who made the jump directly to the NBA. Throughout the history of Irish basketball thus far, Cummins was one a very small number of Irish-born male players to ever earn a basketball scholarship to an American NCAA Division I college (Lafayette College) under head Coach Fran O'Hanlon. By the end of his college career he was ranked 5th in most three-pointers made in Lafayette basketball history and was named to the National Association of Basketball Coaches (NABC) Honor Court. Cummins scored 20 plus points on three occasions, including a big home win over Army. Cummins started for Lafayette throughout each of his four years there and as a freshman, Cummins high-scored with 17 points against final-four team Louisville (2004).

After graduating in 2008, Cummins played professionally in Europe. In 2019 Cummins signed for the City of Edinburgh Kings basketball club where he won the Scottish National Cup, was the Scottish cup final MVP (24 points), was named 'National-League Import Player of the Year' and finished as the Scottish league's top scorer at 26 ppg. In the Scottish Universities league final, Cummins scored 54 points as Edinburgh defeated rivals Glasgow to win the title. In 2010 Cummins signed with the Ulster Elks and averaged 18 ppg in the Irish Superleague. In 2011/2012 Cummins signed with Belfast Star where he averaged 20 ppg and finished as the top scoring Irish player in the Superleague. After numerous recurring knee injuries since 2009, he decided to retire from playing basketball competitively in 2012. After three years Cummins then returned to the court and signed wit Templeogue Basketball Club (TBC) who compete in the Irish Superleague from 2015-2017. In those two years with TBC Cummins won the Irish Superleage Cup (2015/2016) and then the Irish Superleague in the 2016/2017 season. Cummins retired after the 2017 Irish Superleague victory.

In 2005 Cummins set up a basketball clinic for Irish youth players named 'Hoopsclinic' which has grown each year and promoted the game of basketball to a wide network of youth players keen on developing their fundamental basketball skills. In 2011, Cummins also established Sport-Dream-Academy (SDA); an elite sports development academy that is based on 3 missions: 1) Providing Top-Quality Coaching on all aspects of the game in order to develop individual and team skills leading to personal player improvement 2) Creating an ‘Elite-Level’ performance environment where athletes can be challenged and can compete and develop their skills according to their talent and potential 3) Exposing top Irish talent to potential opportunities in sport both at home and abroad. Since SDA was started in 2013, it has supported numerous athletes in pursuing their student-athlete careers abroad including five athletes who went on to play NCAA Division-1 basketball.

Cummins graduated Lafayette College (USA) in 2008 with a BA double-degree in psychology and music. Cummins is a qualified performance psychologist, having received his MSc degree in 2009 from the University of Edinburgh.  He then completed an MBA at the University of Ulster in 2010. In 2014 Cummins completed his Ph.D. in Psychology where he researched Leadership in Sport and Business and has worked in and with numerous organisations over the past 5 years on personal and team leadership and sustainable culture change. Cummins has also worked, and continues to work with a range of top athletes (including Olympic athletes) and business leaders in improving performance and their capacity to lead effectively. Cummins has numerous published articles on Leadership in Sport, and in 2015 co-authored a book entitled 'Leadership in Sport' followed by a 2018 book named Leadership in Sports Coaching. Cummins is currently Managing Director at SeaChange Ltd; an Irish organisational development and risk management company, and he directs Basketball Ireland's Junior Leinster Academy.

References

External links 
 http://www.eurobasket.com/player.asp?Cntry=USA&PlayerID=17032
 https://www.routledge.com/Leadership-in-Sports-Coaching-A-Social-Identity-Approach/Cummins-OBoyle-Cassidy/p/book/9781138281912
 https://www.routledge.com/Leadership-in-Sport/OBoyle-Murray-Cummins/p/book/9781138818255
 https://arpgweb.com/journal/journal/7
 https://journals.sagepub.com/doi/10.1177/0894845314532713
 https://www.amazon.co.uk/Effectiveness-Health-Safety-Communication-Practices/dp/3845444312/ref=sr_1_8?ie=UTF8&qid=1391516741&sr=8-8&keywords=paul+cummins+in+books
 http://sda.ie/about/
 http://www.seachange.ie/
 http://www.seachange-corporate.com/

Irish men's basketball players
South Kent School alumni
1984 births
Living people
City of Edinburgh Kings players